Joseph Ghougassian (born 1944) is a former American ambassador to Qatar (1985-1989).  He was the first naturalized United States citizen from the Middle East to become a U.S. Ambassador.

Ghougassian received his bachelor's and master's degrees from Gregorian University in Rome, a PhD in philosophy from the University of Louvain, Belgium and a JD and an MA in international relations from the University of San Diego.

He founded the American School of Doha.

References

1944 births
Living people
Ambassadors of the United States to Qatar
Pontifical Gregorian University alumni
University of San Diego alumni
Naturalized citizens of the United States
20th-century American diplomats